The Weinheim Longhorns are an American football team from Weinheim, Germany. The club's greatest success was promotion to the German Football League in 2006, where it spent four seasons. In this time the club reached the play-offs on three occasions. It is also notable as the team where Markus Kuhn played before going to College in the US and later being drafted in the seventh round by the New York Giants. Kuhn later became the first German born player to score an NFL touchdown.

History
The club was formed in 1990 as the football department of the TSG Weinheim.

The Longhorns entered league football in 1991, playing in the tier four Verbandsliga Baden-Württemberg. The club's early years were of limited success, playing in the state leagues of Baden-Württemberg as a mid-table team. Things only improved for the side in 1999 when it won the Oberliga title unbeaten and entered the tier three Regionalliga Mitte for 2000.

Weinheim played in the Regionalliga for the next four seasons, achieving good results and finally won the league in 2004 after another unbeaten season. The club gained entry to the 2nd Bundesliga for 2005  and finished in third place in the southern division in its first year there. The following season, the Longhorns won their division and, after defeating the Munich Cowboys in both promotion round games, earned the right to play in the GFL.

In Germany's highest football league, the club finished fourth in all of its first three seasons, on the same winning percentage each year, and qualified for the play-offs on all three occasions. As the lowest placed southern team in the play-offs it had to encounter the best team from the north on each of those three occasions and the Braunschweig Lions, Kiel Baltic Hurricanes and Berlin Adler were to strong an opposition to overcome in the first round but the Longhorns achieved respectable results in each encounter.

The 2010 season was far less successful with the team failing to win a single game and finishing last in their division. It had to face the Wiesbaden Phantoms in the relegation round and lost both of these games, too, and was consequently relegated to the GFL 2. The 2011 season, one level lower, proved to be not much more successful. The team lost 12 of its 14 season games, came last once more and dropped another level, now to the Regionalliga Mitte again.

After the recent decline of the football team it was rumored that the club would merge with the Rhein-Neckar Bandits from near-by Mannheim or at least form some cooperation. The Longhorns management however declared that while the two clubs have had talks about joint training seasons the club would retain its independence and not merge with the Bandits.

In the 2012 season in the Regionalliga the club's troubles continued, finishing last after losing all ten season games, suffering another relegation, now to the Oberliga Baden-Würtemberg, where it finished second-last in 2013 and 2014. The team improved in 2015 and won the league, earning promotion to the Regionalliga Mitte.

Honours
 GFL
 League membership: (4) 2007–2010
 Play-off qualification: (3) 2007–2009
 GFL 2
 Southern Division champions: 2006

Recent seasons
Recent seasons of the club:

 RR = Relegation round
 PR = Promotion round
 QF = Quarter finals
 SF = Semi finals
 GB = German Bowl

References

External links
  Official website
  German Football League official website
  Football History Historic American football tables from Germany

American football teams in Germany
German Football League teams
American football teams established in 1990
Sport in Baden-Württemberg
1990 establishments in West Germany
Weinheim